Stuart Matsikenyeri (born 3 May 1983) is a former Zimbabwean cricketer, who played all formats of the game. He was a right-handed batsman and usually opened the batting for Zimbabwe. Matsikenyeri also bowled part-time right-arm off-break and was a sharp fielder in the gully

International career
Matsikenyeri was a promising junior player and he represented Zimbabwe at U-16 and U-19 levels. It was thus no surprise when he made his international debut against Pakistan in November 2002, opening the batting. He participated in the 2003 Cricket World Cup, although he only played in one game. Later in the year he played in the NatWest Series in England and he scored a crucial 44 at Trent Bridge as Zimbabwe pulled off an upset win.

His strengths are on the cut and pull but he has at times struggled against high quality pace bowling in international cricket, often getting out to loose shots. In 2006 he spent time out of the side after refusing to sign a new contract with the board. He returned however and went on to bring up his 1000th ODI run for Zimbabwe in early 2007, becoming one of only four players in the 2007 World Cup squad to have done so.

Included in the 2007 World Cup squad, he is the only remaining member of the 2003 World Cup Zimbabwe squad. Matsikenyeri won man of the match award for the knock of 89, which is his highest ODI score, where he guided his team in to victory against Bangladesh.

In 2009,he along with Tatenda Taibu set the record for the highest 6th wicket partnership for Zimbabwe in ODIs(188)

References

External links
 

Zimbabwean cricketers
Zimbabwe One Day International cricketers
Zimbabwe Test cricketers
Zimbabwe Twenty20 International cricketers
CFX Academy cricketers
Manicaland cricketers
1983 births
Living people
Cricketers from Harare
Cricketers at the 2015 Cricket World Cup